The 2017 China Open Super Series Premier is the eleventh Super Series tournament of the 2017 BWF Super Series. The tournament will take place at Haixia Olympic Sports Center in Fuzhou, China from November 14 – 19, 2017 and has a total purse of $700,000.

Men's singles

Seeds

Top half

Bottom half

Finals

Women's singles

Seeds

Top half

Bottom half

Finals

Men's doubles

Seeds

Top half

Bottom half

Finals

Women's doubles

Seeds

Top half

Bottom half

Finals

Mixed doubles

Seeds

Top half

Bottom half

Finals

References

External links
 Official Website
 Tournament Link

2017 BWF Super Series
2017 in Chinese sport
2017 Super Series Premier
November 2017 sports events in China